

Committee of Selection

14th Parliament

13th Parliament

12th Parliament

11th Parliament

10th Parliament

9th Parliament

8th Parliament

7th Parliament

6th Parliament

5th Parliament

4th Parliament

3rd Parliament

2nd Parliament

1st Parliament

House Committee

14th Parliament

Committee of Privileges

14th Parliament

Standing Order Committee

14th Parliament

References

External links
http://www.parlimen.gov.my/index.php

Malaysian parliaments

Lists of members of the Parliament of Malaysia